The Dalsfjord Bridge is a suspension bridge over the Dalsfjorden in Vestland county, Norway. The bridge connects the municipalities of Fjaler and Askvoll on either side of the fjord. It was opened on 14 December 2013. The bridge was built as part of the Dalsfjord Connection project and is part of Norwegian County Road 609. On the west side, the road enters the Otterstein Tunnel, while on the east side of the bridge the road enters a  tunnel arm into a roundabout inside the Nishammart Tunnel.

History
The bridge plans date back to the 1960s and a desire for a road connection between the villages of Askvoll and Dale and the town of Førde with a road on the north side of the Dalsfjorden. Among other things, 1,200 signatures were collected in support of the project in 1962. Later, it was decided that a bridge would be built across the Dalsfjorden. In 1975, construction of the road started from the ferry dock at Eikenes and inwards the fjord towards Otterstein, where the Dalsfjord bridge was to be built over to Nishammar on the south side. After  of road and one  tunnel had been built, roadwork was stopped in 1979. In 1981, the project was put on hold even though it had already cost  and the new road ended at a rock wall. During the 1990s, the road project was discussed further, but it wasn't until 2010 when the project was resumed. The road opened in 2013.

References

Askvoll
Fjaler
Bridges in Vestland